"How Do I Survive" is a song originally sung by The Paul Bliss Band and written by Paul Bliss himself. In 1980, American pop singer Amy Holland recorded her own version for her debut album. Holland often performed this song live on TV programs, such as Music Fair and Young Oh! Oh!. This song is her only Top 40 hit to date, peaking at #22 on the US Billboard Hot 100 and #34 Adult Contemporary.

In that same year, Dan Seals had also recorded this song on his album Stones, although he didn't release it as a single. The song was later covered by The Nolans in 1982, and their version of the song appeared on their 1982 album Portrait.

Info
 This song was the first track off of Amy Holland's debut album.
 The success of this song helped Amy earn a Grammy Nomination for Best New Artist in 1981, however, she didn't win it.

References

1980 songs
1980 singles
1982 singles
Capitol Records singles
Amy Holland songs
Songs written by Paul Bliss